Live at the Town Crier is a live recording of Gandalf Murphy and the Slambovian Circus of Dreams' August 25, 2000 show at the Towne Crier Cafe in Pawling, New York. 

This is a two disc album which contains the songs from the show and some of the introductions. 

This album is currently out of print, but is available through iTunes.

Track listing

Disc one
"Invocation" – 3:17
"Slambovia" – 5:10
"Silent Revolution" – 6:07
"Sunday in the Rain" – 4:32
"My Girl" – 3:26
"A Good Thief Tips His Hat" – 5:24
"Baby Jane" – 6:54
"Genius" – 8:46

Disc two
"Never Fit" – 6:21
"Already Broken" – 6:01
"Talkin' to the Buddah" – 9:27
"Circus of Dreams" – 4:45
"Alligators" – 7:56
"Alice in Space" – 5:58

See also
 

Gandalf Murphy and the Slambovian Circus of Dreams albums
2001 live albums